An All-American team is an honorary sports team composed of the best amateur players of a specific season for each team position—who in turn are given the honorific "All-America" and typically referred to as "All-American athletes", or simply "All-Americans". Although the honorees generally do not compete together as a unit, the term is used in U.S. team sports to refer to players who are selected by members of the national media. Walter Camp selected the first All-America team in the early days of American football in 1889.  The 2013 NSCAA Men's Soccer All-Americans are honorary lists that include All-American selections by the National Soccer Coaches Association of America.

All-American Teams

NCAA Division I 

First team

Second team

Third team

NCAA Division II

NCAA Division III

NAIA

NCCAA Division I

NCCAA Division II

Scholar All-Americans

References 

2013 in American soccer